Gian Luigi Berti (16 May 1930 – 26 February 2014) was Captain Regent of San Marino from 1 October 1993 to 1 April 1994.

A lawyer, he was active in San Marinese politics for over 40 years. He was a member of the Sammarinese Christian Democratic Party .

References

1930 births
2014 deaths
Captains Regent of San Marino
Members of the Grand and General Council
Sammarinese lawyers
Sammarinese Christian Democratic Party politicians
Secretaries of State for Finance of San Marino
Secretaries of State for Industry of San Marino
Secretaries of State for Interior of San Marino
Secretaries of State for Justice of San Marino
Secretaries of State for Labor of San Marino
Secretaries of State for Trade of San Marino